Adam Lupel (born 1970 in Chicago) is a writer and international relations expert.

Biography 
Lupel was born in Chicago, Illinois in 1970. He received his bachelor's degree in international relations with a concentration in Latin America from Boston University and his PhD in political theory and master's in liberal studies from the New School for Social Research

Career 
Adam Lupel is the Vice President and Chief Executive Officer at the International Peace Institute (IPI) in New York.

He was managing editor of Constellations: An International Journal of Critical and Democratic Theory before joining IPI in 2006 as editor. He later became the director of research and publications for IPI and the Independent Commission on Multilateralism (2014-2016).

Lupel is the author of Globalization and Popular Sovereignty: Democracy’s Transnational Dilemma (2009) and the co-editor of Peace Operations and Organized Crime: Enemies or Allies? (2011) and Responding to Genocide: The Politics of International Action (2013). His current work is on issues related to globalization, multilateralism, and the prevention of mass atrocities.

References 

Living people
The New School alumni
Boston University College of Arts and Sciences alumni
International relations scholars
American political scientists
1970 births